The 2017–18 Ligue 1 season, also known as Ligue 1 Conforama for sponsorship reasons, was the 80th season since its establishment. The season started on 4 August 2017 and ended on 19 May 2018. Monaco were the defending champions.

On 15 April, Paris Saint-Germain won their seventh Ligue 1 title with five games to spare following a 7–1 victory over Monaco.

Teams

Twenty teams competed in the league, with three promoted teams from Ligue 2: Strasbourg (Ligue 2 champions, after a nine-year absence), Amiens (Ligue 2 runner-up, their first ever Ligue 1) and Troyes (winner of the relegation play-off against Lorient, with immediate return), replacing the three relegated teams from the 2016–17 Ligue 1 season: Bastia (finished 20th, after five years), Nancy (finished 19th, with immediate return) and Lorient (lost the relegation play-off against Troyes, after 11 years). This season was also the first since the 2010-11 season to not feature a team from the island of Corsica.

Stadia and locations

Personnel and kits

Managerial changes

League table

Results

Relegation play-offs
The 2017–18 season ended with a relegation play-off between the 18th-placed Ligue 1 team, Toulouse, and the winner of the semifinal of the Ligue 2 play-off, Ajaccio, on a two-legged confrontation.

The first match, which was supposed to be held in Ajaccio, took place behind closed doors in Montpellier.

Toulouse won 4–0 on aggregate and therefore both clubs remained in their respective leagues.

Number of teams by regions

Season statistics

Top goalscorers

Hat-tricks

Note
4 Player scored 4 goals

Clean sheets

References

External links 

 

Ligue 1 seasons
1
France